Morton's The Steakhouse is a chain of steak restaurants with locations in the United States and franchised abroad, founded in Chicago in 1978. It is a wholly owned subsidiary of Landry's.

History
Morton's was co-founded in 1978 by Arnold J. Morton and Klaus Fritsch. Before they became friends and restaurant entrepreneurs, Morton and Fritsch worked together at the Playboy Club in Montreal, Quebec, Canada. While the club was in the process of changing its menu, Fritsch prepared a hamburger for Morton to sample. Morton said the burger was the best he'd ever tasted. Together, they opened Morton's of Chicago in Newberry Plaza in Downtown Chicago. The original location closed in November 2020 as a result of the COVID-19 pandemic.

In 1987, Morton's, then with $15 million in sales and nine restaurants throughout the United States, was sold for $12.4 million to the venture capital firm Quantum Restaurant Group, Inc. in partnership with the Baltimore brokerage house Alex. Brown & Sons. Fritsch stayed on as president.

In December 2011, Tilman Fertitta, President, CEO and sole owner of Landry's, Inc., announced his company had acquired all of Morton's stock, assuming complete ownership. In 2012, Landry's completed the acquisition and moved company operations to its own headquarters in Houston.

Special events
Some Morton's locations host ESPN’s "Lunch with a Legend" series, where guests dine and interact with current and former athletes. These have included Dwyane Wade, Bobby Hull, Derrick Rose, Dick Vermeil, Tony Stewart, Elgin Baylor and others. Morton's also hosts "Celebrity Server" events to raise funds for local foundations and charities. Local celebrities, including Larry Fitzgerald, Jim Furyk, Jack Nicklaus and Jonathan Vilma act as waiters at these special events.

Support for Brett Kavanaugh 
In July 2022, Supreme Court Justice Brett Kavanaugh attended a dinner at Morton's location in Washington, DC, but left before his dessert course due to the presence of pro-choice protesters from the activist group "ShutDownDC" demanding his removal. Kavanaugh reportedly did not see, hear, or encounter the protestors, nor was harassed in any way. Nonetheless, Morton's was "outraged" and sided with Kavanaugh in a press statement, citing what it termed a "right to congregate and eat dinner".

Morton's was subsequently targeted by pro-choice activists, receiving a flood of fake reservations. Morton's Chief Operating Officer acknowledged that the company's statement was extremely unpopular, and reportedly told restaurant managers that "Currently we are experiencing a massive wave (trending at #2 on social media now) of negative response to our comments yesterday."

Affiliates
 Bubba Gump Shrimp Company
 Cadillac Bar
 Landry's, Inc.
 Landry's Seafood
 Rainforest Cafe

References

External links
 Headquarters for Landry's Inc.
 List of all subsidiaries of Landry's Inc.

Landry's Inc.
Restaurant chains in the United States
Steakhouses in the United States
Food and drink companies based in Houston
Restaurants established in 1978
Restaurants in Chicago
1978 establishments in Illinois
2012 mergers and acquisitions
Morton family (restaurants)